Balcony of Sicily refers to the Sicilian town of Chiaramonte Gulfi in the province of Ragusa. The town was given this nickname for its panoramic position, with views over the Valley of the Ippari and its towns (Comiso, Vittoria, Acate) and all the way to the Mediterranean Sea if looking south, as far as Mount Etna in direction north and to the Erean Mountains with Caltagirone if looking west.

Geography of Sicily